The 1979 BC Lions finished in third place in the Western Conference with a 9–6–1 record. They appeared in the Western Semi-Final.

Jerry Tagge had a great start to the season and led the Lions to a 6-1-1 record.  However, he suffered a catastrophic knee injury mid-season that would end his career.  Under sophomore backup Joe Paopao, the Lions lost five, but finished third with a 9-6-1 record, before bowing out to Calgary in the semi-final.   The duo threat backfield of Larry Key with 1060 rushing yards & 289 receiving yards and John Henry White with 776 rushing yards & 422 receiving yards help carry the team after Tagge went down.

Key was a CFL All-star, along with Centre Al Wilson (for 5th straight season) and kicker Lui Passaglia who was led the league punting and was 2nd in league scoring.

After the season, "Dirty Thirty" Jim Young retired from football after 13 seasons. He retired as the Lions all-time leading receiver with 9248 yards and 65 touchdowns.  Young's receiving yardage record would stand for 31 years.

Norm Fieldgate became the second Lions player to be inducted into the Canadian Football Hall of Fame.

Offseason

CFL Draft

Roster

Preseason

Regular season

Season standings

Season schedule

Playoffs

West Semi-Final

Offensive leaders

Awards and records

1979 CFL All-Stars
RB – Larry Key, CFL All-Star
C – Al Wilson, CFL All-Star
K – Lui Passaglia, CFL All-Star

References

BC Lions seasons
1979 Canadian Football League season by team
1979 in British Columbia